Ángel Martínez may refer to:

Sports
 Ángel Martínez (footballer, born 1965), Mexican football manager and former defender
 Angel Martínez (footballer, born 1983), Paraguayan football centre-back
 Ángel Martínez (footballer, born 1986), Spanish football midfielder
 Ángel Martínez (footballer, born 1991), Spanish football defender
 Ángel Martínez (baseball), Dominican baseball player

Politics
 Ángel Pérez Martínez, Spanish politician
 Angel Viera Martínez (1915–2005), Puerto Rican politician
 Angel Rios Martinez, official chronicler of Blanca, Murcia, Spain

See also
 Ángel Martínez Casado, Dominican friar and PhD in History and Theology.